Nectandra obtusata is a species of plant in the family Lauraceae. It is found in Bolivia, Peru, Colombia and Ecuador.

References

obtusata
Near threatened flora of South America
Taxonomy articles created by Polbot
Trees of Colombia
Trees of Peru
Trees of Ecuador
Trees of Bolivia